is a landmark decision of the United Kingdom Supreme Court which holds that a bribe or secret commission accepted by an agent is held on trust for his principal. In so ruling, the Court partially overruled Sinclair Investments (UK) Ltd v Versailles Trade Finance Ltd (a decision of the Court of Appeal of England and Wales) in favour of The Attorney General for Hong Kong v Reid (New Zealand) (UKPC), a ruling from the Judicial Committee of the Privy Council on appeal from New Zealand.

Facts
Cedar Capital Partners LLC ("Cedar" or "the defendants") provided consultancy services to the hotel industry.  Cedar agreed to act as the agent of FHR European Ventures LLP ("the Purchaser" or "FHR" or "the claimants") in negotiations for purchase of share capital in Monte Carlo Grand Hotel SAM from Monte Carlo Grand Hotel Ltd ("the Vendor" or "Monte Carlo").
 In September 2004, Cedar entered into an agreement with the Vendor which provided for the payment to Cedar of a €10m fee following a successful conclusion of the sale and purchase of the issued share capital of Monte Carlo Grand Hotel SAM. 
 In December 2004, the sale went ahead: the Purchaser acquired the issued share capital of Monte Carlo Grand Hotel SAM from the Vendor for €211.5m. 
 In January 2005, the Vendor paid Cedar the €10m commission. 
 In November 2009 the Purchaser commenced an action for recovery of the sum of €10m from Cedar and other parties on the ground of breach of fiduciary duty.
The Purchaser argued that Cedar owed a fiduciary duty. In breach of that fiduciary duty, Cedar had made a secret commission. The Purchaser argued that this secret commission was now held on constructive trust.

Judgment

High Court
Simon J ruled in favour of the claimants, concluding that he should:

Make a declaration of liability for breach of fiduciary duty on the part of Cedar for having failed to obtain the claimants' fully informed consent in respect of the €10m; and
Order Cedar to pay such sum to the claimants, but, in a further ruling,
He refused to grant the claimants a proprietary remedy in respect of the monies.

In the latter ruling, he held that he was bound by the precedents in Sinclair and Cadogan. He stated:

Accordingly, he issued the following declaration:

The Claimants appealed the ruling as to the declaration issued, submitting that it should be in the form of a proprietary remedy instead.

Court of Appeal
In a unanimous decision, the appeal was allowed. Lewison LJ acknowledged that, as Sinclair had endorsed Metropolitan Bank v Heiron  and Lister & Co v Stubbs, he was bound to follow them as well. Upon reviewing the authorities, he felt he could distinguish the case on the facts:

Etherton C also agreed that the appeal should be allowed, but emphasised that Boardman v Phipps had received inadequate consideration in the reasoning underlying Sinclair. Pill LJ agreed with both judgments.

Cedar appealed the ruling to the Supreme Court.

Supreme Court
The Supreme Court dismissed the appeal, and held that Cedar (the defendants) held the €10m commission on constructive trust for FHR (the claimants). Lord Neuberger gave the leading judgment, with which the whole Court agreed.

Previous jurisprudence

Fiduciary duties
The following general principles were summarized in Bristol and West Building Society v Mothew:

An agent owes a fiduciary duty to his principal because he is "someone who has undertaken to act for or on behalf of [his principal] in a particular matter in circumstances which give rise to a relationship of trust and confidence".
As a result, an agent "must not make a profit out of his trust" and "must not place himself in a position in which his duty and his interest may conflict." In that regard, the former proposition is "part of the [latter] wider rule".
"[A] fiduciary who acts for two principals with potentially conflicting interests without the informed consent of both is in breach of the obligation of undivided loyalty; he puts himself in a position where his duty to one principal may conflict with his duty to the other." Such "informed consent" is only effective if it is given after "full disclosure."

Where an agent receives a benefit in breach of his fiduciary duty, it is obliged to account to the principal for such a benefit, and to pay, in effect, a sum equal to the profit by way of equitable compensation. As Lord Russell explained in Regal (Hastings) Ltd v Gulliver:

Where an agent acquires a benefit in breach of his fiduciary duty, the relief accorded by equity is "primarily restitutionary or restorative rather than compensatory," representing a personal remedy for the principal against the agent. However, in some cases where an agent acquires a benefit which came to his notice as a result of his fiduciary position, or pursuant to an opportunity which results from his fiduciary position, the equitable rule is that he is to be treated as having acquired the benefit on behalf of his principal, so that it is beneficially owned by the principal. In such cases, the principal has a proprietary remedy in addition to his personal remedy against the agent, and the principal can elect between the two remedies. The equitable rule is strictly applied, and has its origins in the 1726 case of Keech v Sandford.

Other jurisdictions
Extensive debate occurred as to the limits and boundaries of the equitable rule, especially where a bribe or secret commission was obtained by an agent in breach of his fiduciary duty to his principal:

Several commentators contended that it is not a benefit which can properly be said to be the property of the principal. This view has been supported in Sinclair.
Others submitted that, where an agent receives a benefit, which is, or results from, a breach of the fiduciary duty owed to his principal, the agent holds the benefit on trust for the principal. This has received legal recognition in Reid.

Sinclair was seen to be the more controversial decision, and has attracted considerable debate in academic literature. The Court of Appeal of Singapore preferred to follow Reid instead, as has the Federal Court of Australia and the British Columbia Court of Appeal. In England and Wales, several judges have expressed a preference for Reid. United States jurisprudence has tended to be similar to Reid.

Significance of FHR
FHR was significant in several respects:

 The view that an agent should not hold a bribe or commission on trust, because he could not have acquired it on behalf of his principal, is inconsistent with several long-standing English decisions.
 Tyrrell v Bank of London (upon which Heiron and Lister were based) was disapproved, as it failed to consider the previous decision in Fawcett v Whitehouse, and therefore should not be followed, and
 any subsequent decisions, at least in so far as they relied on or followed Heiron and Lister, should be treated as overruled.

Consequences
While Reid was concerned with a criminal situation, FHR arose from a commercial one. It is argued that a proprietary remedy for bribes and secret commissions can thus be awarded in a variety of situations:

payments as disguised fees or loans by vendors or landlords to agents, and
transfers of shares, or payments to a trustee, in order to induce a desired action.

The practical implications have been asserted as extending over a broad range:

It encompasses all manner of fiduciary relationships, including employer-employee, company-director, some categories of public official, and trustee-beneficiary.
While the proprietary remedy will allow tracing into the assets of the agent and any relevant third parties in order to claim any fruits of the fraud, a personal claim is still available where it may yield greater value.
The proprietary remedy also attracts ancillary measures, including freezing injunctions and Chabra relief.
Under English law, proprietary claims to bribes and secret commissions may not be time-barred under the Limitation Act 1980, as it may amount to a claim to recover trust property. 
As the ruling will allow civil cases to conduct more factual enquiries into the circumstances surrounding secret payments, it will be necessary for agents to disclose such activities more extensively and to obtain appropriate approval from their principals.
As claimant-principals will now be able to assert title to bribes and secret commissions in their agent’s hands, unsecured creditors may lose out in any connected insolvency proceedings.

In its judgment, the Supreme Court addressed the divergence of opinions arising in the various common law jurisdictions:

It also gave guidance in assessing the relevance of prior jurisprudence:

See also
English trusts law

Further reading

References

Supreme Court of the United Kingdom cases
2014 in case law
2014 in British law
English trusts case law